The PFL 5 mixed martial arts event for the 2018 season of the Professional Fighters League was held on August 2, 2018, at the Nassau Coliseum in Uniondale, New York. This is the fifth regular season event of 2018 and included only fights in the lightweight and light heavyweight divisions.

Background
Brian Foster was expected to face Natan Schulte at this event. However, Foster was removed due to an unspecified illness and replaced by Jason High.

Originally a fight was set between Islam Mamedov and Efrain Escudero. However, Escudero missed the 156-pound weight limit by over seven pounds, and the bout was scratched from the card all together. As a result, Mamedov was awarded 3 points via walkover victory.

Results

Standings after event
The point system consists of outcome based scoring and bonuses for an early win. Under the outcome based scoring system, the winner of a fight receives 3 points and the loser receives 0 points. If the fight ends in a draw, both fighters will receive 1 point. The bonus for winning a fight in the first, second, or third round is 3 points, 2 points, and 1 point respectively. For example, if a fighter wins a fight in the first round, then the fighter will receive 6 total points. If a fighter misses weight, then the fighter that missed weight will receive 0 points and his opponent will receive 3 points due to a walkover victory.

Lightweight

Although Efrain Escudero won his fight, he was ineligible to earn point due to missing the weight limit.

Light Heavyweight

♛ = Clinched playoff spot --- E = Eliminated

See also
List of PFL events
List of current PFL fighters

References

Professional Fighters League
2018 in mixed martial arts
Mixed martial arts in New York (state)
Sports in Long Island
2018 in sports in New York (state)
August 2018 sports events in the United States